Chad Smith (born February 24, 1980) is an American soccer player.

Career

College
Smith played college soccer at Midwestern State University from 2003 to 2006. During his college years he also played in the Pacific Coast Soccer League with Okanagan Challenge, and in the USL Premier Development League with the Texas Spurs and the Virginia Beach Submariners.

Professional
Undrafted out of college, Smith spent time playing for the reserve teams of FC Dallas and Houston Dynamo in 2007, featuring in several MLS Reserve Division games but never being called up to either team's senior squad. He signed with the Charlotte Eagles in the USL Second Division in 2008 and made his professional debut on April 19, 2008, in Charlotte's 2008 season opener against Bermuda Hogges.

References

External links
 Charlotte Eagles bio

1980 births
Living people
American soccer players
Charlotte Eagles players
FC Dallas players
Houston Dynamo FC players
Okanagan Challenge players
DFW Tornados players
Virginia Beach Piranhas players
USL League Two players
USL Second Division players
USL Championship players
Midwestern State Mustangs men's soccer players
Soccer players from Houston
Association football defenders